Érick Bernabé Barrondo García (born 14 June 1991) is a Guatemalan racewalker who competes in the 20 km walk and 50 km walk events. He won the silver medal at the Men's 20 km Racewalk in the 2012 Summer Olympics, the first and only Olympic medal in Guatemala's history.

Early life
He was born in Aldea Chiyuc in the municipality of San Cristóbal Verapaz, Alta Verapaz Department, Guatemala. Initially, Barrondo competed in long-distance running events, following in the footsteps of his parents. However, he sustained an injury and was introduced to racewalking as a method of recovering. He decided to give up running and focus on walking instead. He began working with Rigoberto Medina, a Cuban coach who had trained the 2003 Pan American champion Cristina López.

Career
Barrondo made his international debut at the 2011 Pan American Race Walking Cup, where he claimed the silver medal in the 20 km with a time of 1:25:56 hours. Competing in the 2011 IAAF World Race Walking Challenge tour, he came in 13th at the Sesto San Giovanni race and then improved his personal best by over four minutes at the Dublin Race Walking Grand Prix, coming in fourth place with a time of 1:20:58 hours. As a result of this performance, he was selected to represent Guatemala at the 2011 World Championships in Athletics, being one of only two entrants from his country, alongside fellow walker Jamy Franco. In the World Championships 20 km race, he came in tenth place with a time of 1:22:08 hours and was the second best performer from the Americas, behind Luis Fernando López who came third.

At the 2011 Pan American Games in October, he and Jamy Franco completed a Guatemalan double in the men's and women's 20 km walks. Barrondo won the gold medal in a time of 1:21:51 hours, seeing off a challenge from World Championships medalist López. He walked to a personal best in the 20 km at the 2012 Memorial Mario Albisetti, taking third place in 1:18:25 hours.

2012 Summer Olympics
In the London Olympics of 2012 he won Guatemala's first ever Olympic medal. He came in the second place in the 20 kilometers race with the time of 1:18:57, just eleven seconds behind China's Chen Ding, who set a new Olympic record. In the 50 kilometers race he was disqualified by the judges.

Barrondo has participated in the Olympics of 2016 and 2020.

Personal life
After the world championships that took place in Moscow in August 2013, he married racewalker Mirna Ortiz.

Barrondo, the only Olympic medalists in Guatemala's history, is of indigenous descent. In April 2015 radio commentator Julio Reyes was widely criticized after making racist comments online regarding Barrondo's heritage.

Personal bests

Achievements

References

External links

Living people
1991 births
Guatemalan male racewalkers
People from Alta Verapaz Department
Athletes (track and field) at the 2011 Pan American Games
Athletes (track and field) at the 2015 Pan American Games
Athletes (track and field) at the 2019 Pan American Games
Pan American Games gold medalists for Guatemala
Pan American Games silver medalists for Guatemala
Olympic silver medalists for Guatemala
Athletes (track and field) at the 2012 Summer Olympics
Athletes (track and field) at the 2016 Summer Olympics
Olympic athletes of Guatemala
Medalists at the 2012 Summer Olympics
World Athletics Championships athletes for Guatemala
Olympic silver medalists in athletics (track and field)
Pan American Games medalists in athletics (track and field)
Guatemalan people of indigenous peoples descent
Central American and Caribbean Games gold medalists for Guatemala
Central American Games gold medalists for Guatemala
Central American Games medalists in athletics
Competitors at the 2014 Central American and Caribbean Games
Central American and Caribbean Games medalists in athletics
Medalists at the 2011 Pan American Games
Medalists at the 2015 Pan American Games
Athletes (track and field) at the 2020 Summer Olympics